A loop antenna is a radio antenna consisting of a loop or coil of wire, tubing, or other electrical conductor, that is usually fed by a balanced source or feeding a balanced load. Within this physical description there are two (possibly three) distinct types:

 Large loop antennas (or self-resonant loop antennas or full-wave loops) have a perimeter close to one or more whole wavelengths at the operating frequency, which makes them self-resonant at that frequency. They are the most efficient of all antenna types for both transmission and reception. Large loop antennas have a two-lobe radiation pattern at their first, full-wave resonance, peaking in both directions perpendicular to the plane of the loop.

 Halo antennas are shortened dipoles that have been bent into a circular loop, with the ends not quite touching. Some writers prefer to exclude them from loop antennas, since they can be well-understood as bent dipoles, others make halos an intermediate category between large and small loops, or the extreme upper limit for small loops: In shape and performance halo antennas are very similar to small loops, only distinguished by being self resonant and having much higher radiation resistance. (See discussion below.)

 Small loop antennas (or magnetic loops or tuned loops) have a perimeter smaller than half the operating wavelength (typically no more than ~ wave). They are used mainly as receiving antennas, but are sometimes used for transmission despite their reduced efficiency; loops with a circumference smaller than about  become so inefficient they are rarely used for transmission. A common example of small loop is the ferrite (loopstick) antenna used in most AM broadcast radios. The radiation pattern of small loop antennas is maximum at directions within the plane of the loop, so perpendicular to the maxima of large loops.

Large, self-resonant loop antennas
For all of the large loops described in this section, the radio's operating frequency is assumed to be tuned to the loop antenna's first resonance. At that frequency, one whole wavelength is slightly smaller than the perimeter of the loop, which is the smallest that a "large" loop can be.

Self-resonant loop antennas for so-called “short” wave frequencies are relatively large, with a perimeter just greater than the intended wavelength of operation, hence for circular loops diameters between roughly 175 ft (53 m) at the largest, around 1.8 MHz. At higher frequencies their sizes become smaller, falling to a diameter of about 11 ft (3.4 m) at 30 MHz.

Large loop antennas can be thought of as a folded dipole whose parallel wires have been split apart and opened out into some oval or polygonal shape. The loop's shape can be a circle, triangle, square, rectangle, or in fact any closed polygon, but for resonance the loop perimeter must be slightly larger than a wavelength.

Shape 

Loop antennas may be in the shape of a circle, a square or any other closed geometric shape that allows the total perimeter to be slightly more than one wavelength. The most popular shape in amateur radio is the quad antenna or "quad", a self-resonant loop in a square shape so that it can be constructed of wire strung across a supporting ‘’ shaped frame. There may be one or more additional loops stacked parallel to the first as 'parasitic' director and / or reflector element(s), creating an antenna array which is unidirectional with gain that increases with each additional parasitic element. This design can also be turned 45 degrees to a diamond shape supported on a ‘’ shaped frame. Triangular loops have also been used for vertical loops, since they require only one elevated support. A rectangle twice as high as its width obtains slightly increased gain and also matches 50 Ω directly if used as a single element.

Unlike a dipole antenna, the polarization of a resonant loop antenna is not obvious from the orientation of the loop itself, but depends on the placement of its feedpoint.
If a vertically oriented loop is fed at the bottom, its radiation will be horizontally polarized; feeding it from the side will make it vertically polarized.

Radiation pattern 
The radiation pattern of a first-resonance loop antenna peaks at right angles to the plane of the loop. At the lower shortwave frequencies a full loop is physically quite large, and its only practical installation is "lying flat", with the plane of the loop horizontal to the ground, with the loop wire supported at the same relatively low height by masts along its perimeter. This results in horizontally-polarized radiation, which unfortunately peaks toward the vertical, which is good for local NVIS communication, but generally not useful for long-distances.

Above about 10 MHz the loop is approximately 10 meters in diameter, and it becomes more practical for the loop to be mounted "standing up" – that is with the plane of the loop vertical, in order to direct its main beam towards the horizon. If small enough, it may be attached to an antenna rotator in order to rotate that direction as desired. Compared to a dipole or folded dipole, a vertical large loop wastes less radiated power toward the sky or ground, resulting in about 1.5 dB higher gain in the two favored horizontal directions.

Additional gain (and a uni-directional radiation pattern) is usually obtained with an array of such elements either as a driven endfire array or in a Yagi configuration (with all but one loop being parasitic elements). The latter is widely used in amateur radio in the "quad" configuration (see photo).

Low frequency one wavelength loops "lying down" are sometimes used for NVIS operation. This is sometimes called a "lazy quad". Its radiation pattern consists of a single lobe straight up (radiation toward the ground which isn't absorbed is reflected upward). The radiation pattern and especially the input impedance is affected by its proximity to the ground. If fed with higher frequencies the antenna input impedance will generally include a reactive part (and a different resistive component) requiring use of an antenna tuner. As the frequency increases, the radiation pattern breaks up into multiple lobes which peak at lower angles relative to the horizon which is advantageous especially at higher frequencies.

Halo antennas
 
A halo antenna is often described as a half-wave dipole antenna that has been bent into a circle.
Although it could be categorized as a bent dipole, it has the omnidirectional radiation pattern very nearly the same as a small loop.
Because of its much greater radiation resisitance, a halo presents a good impedance match to 50 Ohm coaxial cable, and its construction is less demanding, since the maker is not compelled to take as much care to avoid losses from contact resistance.

At  wave, the halo antenna is near or on the extreme high limit of the size range for small loops, but unlike most oversized small loops, it can be analyzed with simple techniques by treating it as a bent dipole.

Practical use

On the VHF bands and above, the physical diameter of a halo is small enough to be effectively used as a mobile antenna.

The horizontal radiation pattern of a horizontal halo is nearly omnidirectional – to within 3 dB or less – and that can be evened out by making the loop slightly smaller and adding more capacitance between the element tips. Not only will that even out the gain, it will reduce upward radiation, which for VHF is typically wasted – radiated into space.

Halos pick up less nearby electrical spark interference than monopoles and dipoles – ignition noise from vehicles for example.

Electrical analysis
Although it has a superficially different appearance, the halo antenna can conveniently be analyzed as a dipole (which also has a large voltage and zero current at its ends) that has been bent into a circle. Because of tacit omission, some texts create the false impression that loops as large as  circumference cannot possibly function as antennas, rather than cannot possibly be analyzed with simple techniques.

The halo's gap
Some writers mistakenly consider the gap in the halo antenna's loop to distinguish it from a small loop antenna – since there is no DC connection between the two ends. But that distinction is lost at RF; the close-bent high-voltage ends are capacitively coupled, with the RF crossing the gap via displacement currents.
The gap in the halo is electrically equivalent to the tuning capacitor on a small loop, although the incidental capacitance involved is not nearly as large.

Small loops

Small loops are small in comparison to their operating wavelength. Contrary to the pattern of large loop antennas, the reception and radiation strength of small loops peaks inside the plane of the loop, rather than broadside (perpendicular) to it.

As with all antennas that are physically much smaller than the operating wavelength, small loop antennas have small radiation resistance which is dwarfed by ohmic losses, resulting in a poor antenna efficiency. They are thus mainly used as receiving antennas at lower frequencies (wavelengths of tens to hundreds of meters). Like a short dipole antenna, the radiation resistance is small. The radiation resistance  is proportional to the square of the area:

The ability to increase the radiation resistance  by using multiple turns is analogous to making a dipole out of two or more parallel lines for each dipole arm ("folded dipole").

Small loops have advantages as receiving antennas at frequencies below 10 MHz. Although a small loop's losses can be high, the same loss applies to both the signal and the noise, so the receiving signal-to-noise ratio of a small loop may not suffer at these lower frequencies, where received noise is dominated by atmospheric noise and static rather than receiver-internal noise. The ability to more manageably rotate a smaller antenna may help to maximize the signal and reject interference.
Several construction techniques are used to ensure that small receiving loops' null directions are "sharp", including adding broken shielding of the loop arms and keeping the perimeter around  wavelength (or  wave at most). Small transmitting loops' perimeters are instead made as large as feasibly possible, up to  wave (or even  if possible), in order to improve their generally poor efficiency.

The small loop antenna is also known as a magnetic loop since the response of an electrically small receiving loop is proportional to the rate of change of magnetic flux through the loop. At higher frequencies (or shorter wavelengths), when the antenna is no longer electrically small, the current distribution through the loop may no longer be uniform and the relationship between its response and the incident fields will become more complex. In the case of transmission, the fields produced by an electrically small loop are the same as an "infinitesimal magnetic dipole" whose axis is perpendicular to the plane of the loop.

Small receiving loops

Several performance factors, including received power, scale in proportion to the loop's area. For a given loop area, the length of the conductor (and thus its net loss resistance) is minimized if the perimeter is circular, making a circle the optimal shape for small loops. Small receiving loops are typically used below 3 MHz where human-made and natural atmospheric noise dominate. Thus the signal-to-noise ratio of the received signal will not be adversely affected by low efficiency as long as the loop is not excessively small.

To increase the magnetic field in the loop and thus its efficiency, while greatly reducing size, the coil of wire is often wound around a ferrite rod magnetic core; this is called a ferrite loop antenna. Such ferrite loop antennas are used in almost all AM broadcast receivers with the notable exception of car radios, since the antenna for the AM band needs to be outside the obstructing metal car chassis.

Small loop antennas are also popular for radio direction finding, in part due to their exceedingly sharp, clear "null" along the loop axis: When the loop axis is aimed directly at the transmitter, the target signal abruptly vanishes.

The radiation resistance  of a small loop is generally much smaller than the loss resistance  due to the conductors composing the loop, leading to a poor antenna efficiency. Consequently, most of the power delivered to a small loop antenna will be converted to heat by the loss resistance, rather than doing useful work.

Wasted power is undesirable for a transmitting antenna, however for a receiving antenna, the inefficiency is not important at frequencies below about 15 MHz. At these lower frequencies, atmospheric noise (static) and man-made noise (radio frequency interference) even a weak signal from an inefficient antenna is far stronger than the internal thermal or Johnson noise generated in the radio receiver's own circuitry, so the weak signal from a loop antenna can be amplified without degrading the signal-to-noise ratio.

For example, at 1 MHz the man-made noise might be 55 dB above the thermal noise floor. If a small loop antenna's loss is 50 dB (as if the antenna included a 50 dB attenuator) the electrical inefficiency of that antenna will have little influence on the receiving system's signal-to-noise ratio.

In contrast, at quieter frequencies at about 20 MHz and above, an antenna with a 50 dB loss could degrade the received signal-to-noise ratio by up to 50 dB, resulting in terrible performance.

Radiation pattern and polarization

Surprisingly, the radiation and receiving pattern of a small loop is perpendicular to that of a large self resonant loop (whose perimeter is close to one wavelength). Since the loop is much smaller than a wavelength, the current at any one moment is nearly constant round the circumference. By symmetry it can be seen that the voltages induced in the loop windings on opposite sides of the loop, will cancel each other when a perpendicular signal arrives on the loop axis. Therefore, there is a null in that direction. Instead, the radiation pattern peaks in directions lying in the plane of the loop, because signals received from sources in that plane do not quite cancel owing to the phase difference between the arrival of the wave at the near side and far side of the loop. Increasing that phase difference by increasing the size of the loop has a large impact in increasing the radiation resistance and the resulting antenna efficiency.

Another way of looking at a small loop as an antenna is to consider it simply as an inductive coil coupling to the magnetic field in the direction perpendicular to plane of the coil, according to Ampère's law. Then consider a  propagating radio wave also perpendicular to that plane. Since the magnetic (and electric) fields of an electromagnetic wave in free space are transverse (no component in the direction of propagation), it can be seen that this magnetic field and that of a small loop antenna will be at right angles, and thus not coupled. For the same reason, an electromagnetic wave propagating within the plane of the loop, with its magnetic field perpendicular to that plane, is coupled to the magnetic field of the coil. Since the transverse magnetic and electric fields of a propagating electromagnetic wave are at right angles, the electric field of such a wave is also in the plane of the loop, and thus the antenna's polarization (which is always specified as being the orientation of the electric, not the magnetic field) is said to be in that plane.

Thus mounting the loop in a horizontal plane will produce an omnidirectional antenna which is horizontally polarized; mounting the loop vertically yields a weakly directional antenna with vertical polarization and sharp nulls along the axis of the loop.

Receiver input tuning
Since a small loop antenna is essentially a coil, its electrical impedance is inductive, with an inductive reactance much greater than its radiation resistance. In order to couple to a transmitter or receiver, the inductive reactance is normally canceled with a parallel capacitance.
Since a good loop antenna will have a high  factor (narrow bandwidth), the capacitor must be variable and is adjusted to match the receiver's tuning.

Small loop receiving antennas are also almost always resonated using a parallel plate capacitor, which makes their reception narrow-band, sensitive only to a very specific frequency. This allows the antenna, in conjunction with a (variable) tuning capacitor, to act as a tuned input stage to the receiver's front-end, in lieu of a preselector.

Direction finding with small loops

As long as the loop perimeter is kept below about  wave, the directional response of small loop antennas includes a sharp null in the direction normal to the plane of the loop, so small loops are favored as compact radio direction finding antennas for long wavelengths.

The procedure is to rotate the loop antenna to find the direction where the signal vanishes – the “null” direction. Since the null occurs at two opposite directions along the axis of the loop, other means must be employed to determine which side of the antenna the “nulled” signal is on. One method is to rely on a second loop antenna located at a second location, or to move the receiver to that other location, thus relying on triangulation.

Instead of triangulation, a second dipole or vertical antenna can be electrically combined with a loop or a loopstick antenna. Called a sense antenna, connecting and matching the second antenna changes the combined radiation pattern to a cardioid, with a null in only one (less precise) direction. The general direction of the transmitter can be determined using the sense antenna, and then disconnecting the sense antenna returns the sharp nulls in the loop antenna pattern, allowing a precise bearing to be determined.

AM broadcast receiving antennas
Small loop antennas are lossy and inefficient for transmitting, but they can be practical receiving antennas for frequencies below 10 MHz. Especially in the mediumwave (520–1710 kHz) band and below, where wavelength-sized antennas are infeasibly large, and the antenna inefficiency is irrelevant, due to large amounts of atmospheric noise.

AM broadcast receivers (and other low frequency radios for the consumer market) typically use small loop antennas, even when a telescoping antenna may be attached for FM reception. A variable capacitor connected across the loop forms a resonant circuit that also tunes the receiver's input stage as that capacitor tracks the main tuning. A multiband receiver may contain tap points along the loop winding in order to tune the loop antenna at widely different frequencies.

In AM radios built prior to the invention of ferrite in the mid-20th century, the antenna might consist of dozens of turns of wire mounted on the back wall of the radio – a planar helical antenna – or a separate, rotatable, furniture-sized rack looped with wire – a frame antenna.

Ferrite 

Ferrite loop antennas are made by winding fine wire around a ferrite rod. They are almost universally used in AM broadcast receivers.
Other names for this type of antenna are loopstick, ferrite rod antenna or aerial, ferroceptor, or ferrod antenna. Often, at mediumwave and lower shortwave frequencies, Litz wire is used for the winding to reduce skin effect losses. Elaborate “basket weave” patterns are used at all frequencies to reduce inter-winding capacitance in the coil insuring that the loop self-resonance is well above the operating frequency, so that it acts as an electrical inductor that can be resonated with a tuning capacitor, and with a consequent improvement of the loop Q factor.

Inclusion of a magnetically permeable core increases the radiation resistance of a small loop, mitigating the inefficiency due to ohmic losses. Like all small antennas, such antennas are tiny compared to their effective area. A typical AM broadcast radio loop antenna wound on ferrite may have a cross sectional area of only  at a frequency at which an ideal (lossless) antenna would have an effective area some hundred million times larger. Even accounting for the resistive losses in a ferrite rod antenna, its effective receiving area may exceed the loop's physical area by a factor of 100.

Small transmitting loops

Size, shape, efficiency, and pattern

Small transmitting loops are “small” in comparison to a full wavelength, but considerably larger than a “small” receive-only loop.
They are typically used on frequencies between 14–30 MHz.
Unlike receiving loops, small transmitting loops’ sizes must be scaled-up for longer wavelengths, in order to maintain adequate radiation resistance, and their larger size blurs or erases the especially sharp null found in smaller receiving loops.

They usually consist of a single turn of large diameter conductor, and are typically round or octagonal to provide maximum enclosed area for a given perimeter. The smaller of these loops are much less efficient than the extraordinary performance of full-sized, self-resonant loops, but where space for a full wave loop or a half-wave dipole is not available, the smaller loops can provide functional, even if inefficient communications. 

A small transmitting loop antenna with a perimeter of 10% or less of the wavelength will have a relatively constant current distribution along the conductor, and the main lobe will be in the plane of the loop. Loops of any size between 10% and 30% of a wavelength in perimeter, up to almost exactly 50% in circumference, can be built and tuned with series capacitor to resonance. A capacitor is required for a circumference less than a half wave, an inductor for loops more than a half wave and less than a full wave. Loops in this size range may have neither the uniform current of the small loop, nor the double peaked current of the full sized loop and thus cannot be analyzed using the concepts developed for the small receiving loops nor full-wave loop antennas. Performance is best determined with NEC analysis. Antennas within this size range include the halo (see above) and the G0CWT (Edginton) loop.

Matching to the transmitter
In addition to other common impedance matching techniques such as a gamma match, transmitting loops are sometimes impedance matched by connecting the feedline to a smaller feed loop inside the area surrounded by the main loop. The combination is in effect a transformer, with power in the near-field inductively coupled from the feed loop to the main loop, which itself is connected to the resonating capacitor and is responsible for radiating most of the power.

Use for land-mobile radio
Vertically aligned small loops are used in military land-mobile radio, at frequencies between 3~7 MHz, because of their ability to direct energy upwards, unlike a conventional whip antenna. For NVIS a typical radiation efficiency of around 1% is acceptable, because signal paths can be established with 1 W of radiated power or less – feasible when a 100 W transmitter is used.

In military use, the antenna may be built using a one or two conductors  in diameter. The loop itself is typically  in diameter.

Power limits
One practical issue with small loops as transmitting antennas is that the loop not only has a very large current going through it, but also has a very high voltage across the capacitor – typically thousands of volts – even when fed with only a few watts of transmitter power. This requires a rather expensive and physically large resonating capacitor with a large breakdown voltage, in addition to having minimal dielectric loss (normally requiring an air-gap capacitor or even a vacuum variable capacitor). In addition to making the geometric loop larger, efficiency may be increased by using larger conductors or other measures to reduce the conductor's loss resistance. However, lower loss means higher  and even greater voltage on the capacitor.

This problem is more serious than occurs with a vertical or dipole antenna that is short compared to a wavelength: For those electrical antennas, matching using a loading coil also generates a high voltage across the antenna end(s). However, unlike with capacitors, the voltage change is gradual, spread across a physically long inductor, and is generally not troublesome.

Loop-like antennas

RFID coils and induction heating 
The use of coupling coils for inductive systems, including their use at LF and HF, is outside the scope of this article.

Inductive heating systems, induction cooking stovetops, and RFID tags and readers all interact by near field magnetic induction rather than far field transmitted waves. So strictly speaking, they are not radio antennas.

Although they are not radio antennas, these systems do operate at radio frequencies, and they involve the use of small magnetic coils, which are called "antennas" in the trade. However, they are more usefully thought of as analogs to the windings in loosely coupled transformers. Although the magnetic coils in these inductive systems sometimes seem indistinguishable from the small loop antennas discussed above, such devices can only operate over short distances, and are specifically designed to avoid transmitting or receiving radio waves. Because Inductive heating systems and RFID readers only use near field alternating magnetic fields, their performance criteria are dissimilar to far field radio antennas discussed in this article.

Footnotes

References

External links

 

  — Online calculator that solves the "Basic equations for a small loop" from The ARRL Antenna Book, 15th edition.

Radio frequency antenna types
Wireless tuning and filtering